The 2019–20 FC St. Pauli season is the 109th season in the football club's history and 9th consecutive season in the second division of German football, the 2. Bundesliga and 27th overall. In addition to the domestic league, FC St. Pauli also are participating in this season's edition of the domestic cup, the DFB-Pokal. This is the 57th season for FC St. Pauli in the Millerntor-Stadion, located in St. Pauli, Hamburg, Germany. The season covers a period from 1 July 2019 to 30 June 2020.

Players

Squad information

Transfers

Summer

In:

Out:

Winter

In:

Out:

Matches

Legend

Friendly matches

2. Bundesliga

League table

Results summary

Results by round

Results

DFB-Pokal

Squad and statistics

! colspan="13" style="background:#DCDCDC; text-align:center" | Players transferred out during the season
|-

|}

References

External links 
 FC St. Pauli (English)

FC St. Pauli seasons
St. Pauli